The women's handball tournament at the 2008 Summer Olympics is being held from August 9 to August 23, at the Olympic Sports Centre Gymnasium and National Indoor Stadium in Beijing.  Twelve nations are represented in the women's tournament.

The four best teams from each group will advance to the quarterfinal round, 5th and 6th teams in each group are classified 9th-12th by the results of their group matches. The losers of quarterfinal matches will compete in the 5th-8th classification matches by the same elimination system as the winners of the quarterfinals.
Three time consecutive defending Champion  Denmark were not part of the 2008 Olympics Handball Tournament, as they did not qualify from the 2007 World Women's Handball Championship.

Qualification

Olympic Qualifying Tournaments:
Tournament I:
Worlds 2nd: 
Worlds 7th: 
Europe: 
Pan-America: 
Tournament II:
Worlds 3rd: 
Worlds 6th: 
Asia: 
Top continent at the Worlds (Europe): 
Tournament III:
Worlds 4th: 
Worlds 5th: 
Africa: 
2nd continent at the Worlds (Asia):

Preliminary round

Seeding
The draw for the groups was held 16 June 2008.

Rosters

Group stage

Group A

Group B

Medal Round
All times are China Standard Time (UTC+8)

Quarterfinals

Classification

Semifinals

7th–8th place

5th–6th place

Bronze medal match

Gold medal match

Rankings and statistics

All Star Team
 Goalkeeper:   Katrine Lunde Haraldsen
 Left wing:    Orsolya Vérten
 Left back:    Liudmila Postnova
 Centre back:  Oh Seong-Ok
 Right back:   Irina Bliznova
 Right wing:   Ramona Maier
 Line player/pivot:  Else-Marthe Sørlie Lybekk
Chosen by team officials and IHF experts: IHF.info

Top Goalkeepers

Top goalscorers

References

External links 
Beijing 2008 Olympic Games
International Handball Federation
European Handball Federation
Team Handball News 2008 Women's Olympic Qualification Summary

Women's tournament
Women's handball in China
2008 in women's handball
2008 in Chinese women's sport
Women's events at the 2008 Summer Olympics